(literally "world-pain") is a literary concept describing the feeling experienced by an individual who believes that reality can never satisfy the expectations of the mind, resulting in "a mood of weariness or sadness about life arising from the acute awareness of evil and suffering".

The translation can differ depending on context; in reference to the self it can mean "world-weariness", while in reference to the world it can mean "the pain of the world".

The worldview of Weltschmerz has been retroactively seen as widespread among Romantic and decadent authors such as Jean Paul, the Marquis de Sade, Lord Byron, Giacomo Leopardi, William Blake, Charles Baudelaire, Paul Verlaine, François-René de Chateaubriand, Oscar Wilde, Alfred de Musset, Mikhail Lermontov, Nikolaus Lenau, Hermann Hesse, and Heinrich Heine.

Further examples

John Steinbeck wrote about this feeling in two of his novels; in East of Eden, Samuel Hamilton feels it after meeting Cathy Trask for the first time, and it is referred to as the Welshrats in The Winter of our Discontent. Ralph Ellison uses the term in Invisible Man with regard to the pathos inherent in the singing of spirituals: "Beneath the swiftness of the hot tempo there was a slower tempo and a cave and I entered it and looked around and heard an old woman singing a spiritual as full of Weltschmerz as flamenco". Kurt Vonnegut references the feeling in his novel Player Piano, in which it is felt by Doctor Paul Proteus and his father.
In John D. MacDonald's novel Free Fall in Crimson, Travis McGee describes  as "homesickness for a place you have never seen".

See also

 Acedia
 Angst
 Compassion fatigue
 Dukkha
 Koyaanisqatsi
 
 
 Mean world syndrome
 Melancholia
 Mono no aware
 Philosophical pessimism
 Nihilism
 Pathos
 Saudade
 
 Social alienation
 Solastalgia
 
 Suffering
 Theory of mind
 Tikkun olam
 Transcendentals
 Ubi sunt
 World view

References

External links

German words and phrases
Literary concepts
Melancholia
Philosophical pessimism
Romanticism
Suffering
Words and phrases with no direct English translation